Chislet Colliery Halt was a minor station on the Ashford to Ramsgate line. It opened in September 1919 and closed in 1971.

History
Chislet Colliery started production in 1919 and halt was opened that year as local housing was inadequate for employees at the colliery. The halt was in the parish of Westbere. There were two platforms initially built of timber but later rebuilt in concrete. In 1961 a signal box was built, it opened on 27 May. Chislet Colliery closed on 25 July 1969, and the halt was renamed Chislet Halt in that year. The halt closed on 4 October 1971. The signal box was permanently switched out on 28 July 1984 and closed on 14 September 1986. As in May 2021 the platforms were still in situ.

References
Citations

Sources
 
 

Canterbury
Railway stations in Great Britain opened in 1919
Railway stations in Great Britain closed in 1971
Disused railway stations in Kent
Former South Eastern Railway (UK) stations
1919 establishments in England
1971 disestablishments in England